Castle of Findon was a castle located in Aberdeenshire, Scotland.

Located overlooking Gamrie Bay,  are the earth mound remains of the castle. The castle was constructed upon a hillfort, that had been constructed to defend the area from Viking raids. The castle was held by the Troup family in the 14th century and passed to the Gardyne family.

Notes

Citations

References

Castles in Aberdeenshire
Ruined castles in Aberdeenshire